Horizontal eccentricity refers to the horizontal axis, measured in degrees, along the visual field. The blind spot extends from an eccentricity d1 to eccentricity d2 in temporal direction from the fovea. The size of the blind spot can be calculated as

External links
 Blind Spot

Eye
Vision